Ammunition is the material fired, scattered, dropped, or detonated from any weapon or weapon system.

Ammunition may also refer to:

 Ammunition (Chamillionaire EP), 2012
 Ammunition (Krewella EP), 2016
 "Ammunition" (song), a 2003 song by Switchfoot
 "Ammunition", a song by Morrissey, from the album Maladjusted